Cigaritis apelles, the rusty bar, is a butterfly in the family Lycaenidae. It is found in Uganda, along the coast of Kenya and in Tanzania, Malawi, the Democratic Republic of the Congo (Sankuru and Lualaba), Mozambique and South Africa (KwaZulu-Natal). The habitat consists of savanna, bordering forests.

References

External links
Die Gross-Schmetterlinge der Erde 13: Die Afrikanischen Tagfalter. Plate XIII 69 f

Butterflies described in 1878
Cigaritis
Butterflies of Africa
Taxa named by Charles Oberthür